John C. Gaunt (1833 – January 13, 1886) was an American soldier who fought in the American Civil War. Gaunt received his country's highest award for bravery during combat, the Medal of Honor. Gaunt's medal was won for his actions during the Battle of Franklin in Franklin, Tennessee on November 30, 1864. He was honored with the award on February 13, 1865.

Gaunt was born in Columbiana County, Ohio, and entered service from Damascoville, Ohio.

Medal of Honor citation

See also
 List of American Civil War Medal of Honor recipients: G–L

References

1833 births
1886 deaths
American Civil War recipients of the Medal of Honor
People from Columbiana County, Ohio
People of Ohio in the American Civil War
Union Army officers
United States Army Medal of Honor recipients